Godwin Kalimbwe (born 27 February 1946) is a Zambian long-distance runner. He competed in the marathon at the 1968 Summer Olympics.

References

1946 births
Living people
Athletes (track and field) at the 1968 Summer Olympics
Zambian male long-distance runners
Zambian male marathon runners
Olympic athletes of Zambia
Place of birth missing (living people)